Herman Graesser (aka Herman Graeser) was a U.S. soccer player who earned one cap with the U.S. national team in a 4-0 loss to Scotland on June 19, 1949.  He played his club soccer in the German American Soccer League.  In 1950, he was with New York.

References 

Year of birth missing
Possibly living people
United States men's international soccer players
German-American Soccer League players
American soccer players
Association footballers not categorized by position